There are little concentrations of Italians and Italian Americans in many metropolitan areas of the United States, especially in the industrial cities of the Northeast and Midwest. Today, the state of New York has the largest population of Italian-Americans in the United States, while Rhode Island and Connecticut have the highest overall percentages in relation to their respective populations.

In sharp contrast, most of the rest of the country (exceptions being South Florida and New Orleans) have very few Italian-American residents. During the labor shortage in the 19th and early 20th centuries, planters in the Deep South did attract some Italian immigrants to work as sharecroppers, but they soon left due to extreme anti-Italian discrimination and strict regimen of the plantations.

According to a recent United Census Bureau estimate, 17.8 million Americans are of Italian descent. Communities of Italian Americans were established in many major industrial cities of the early 20th century, such as Baltimore (particularly Little Italy, Baltimore), Boston (particularly in the North End and East Boston) along with numerous nearby cities and towns, Philadelphia proper (particularly South Philadelphia) and the Philadelphia metro area (particularly neighborhoods in Delco, Atlantic City, Little Italy, Wilmington; and Vineland), Pittsburgh (particularly Bloomfield), Northeastern Pennsylvania cities, Lehigh Valley cities, Detroit, Providence (particularly Federal Hill), St. Louis (particularly The Hill), Chicago, Kansas City, Milwaukee, Youngstown, Erie, Cleveland, Buffalo, Newark, and New York City, which boasts the largest Italian-American population, which live in several concentrated communities in the New York metropolitan area, including the five boroughs, Long Island, Westchester County, Fairfield County and North Jersey. New Orleans, Louisiana was the first site of immigration of Italians into America in the 19th century, before Italy was a unified nation-state. This was before New York Harbor and Baltimore became the preferred destinations for Italian immigrants.

Alabama
 Daphne – Prior to the 1978 annexation of the Lake Forest subdivision, Daphne was a heavily Italian community, and pre-1978 Daphne territory remains Italian, with street names such as Guarisco. The Archdiocese of Mobile considers Christ the King Parish in Daphne an Italian-American parish.

Arizona 
 North Phoenix
 Scottsdale has an Italian community

Arkansas 
 Lake Village, a farming community in southeastern Arkansas, enticed a number of families from northern Italy to become sharecroppers in the 1890s. Following a harsh and deadly winter, about half the families left and established Tontitown, west of Fayetteville, Arkansas in Benton/Washington counties.
 Little Italy in unincorporated northern Pulaski County near Little Rock.

California

Northern California 
 Cotati – Italian community in the area's grape-growing industry.
 Excelsior District, San Francisco – Italian-American Social Club is on Russia St., and Calabria Brothers Deli is around the corner on Mission Street.
 Fresno and some Italian descendants in portions of the San Joaquin Valley (i.e. Kern County with its grape industry). 
 Gilroy – one of CA's wine countries. 
 "Italian Colony", Oakland.
 Marin County (Albert Park, San Rafael).
 Napa – Little Italy is the East Napa historic neighborhoods of First-Juarez-Third Streets and Alta Heights. The Napa Valley wine industry owes its heritage to Italian vintners.
 North Beach, San Francisco – baseball legend Joe DiMaggio grew up here. The Italian Heritage Parade (formerly the Columbus Day Parade) is the oldest in the U.S. and one of the largest. North Beach is also the home of City Lights Books, which helped to give birth to the Beats literary movement.
 Sacramento metro area – descendants of the 1849 California Gold Rush. In December 2021, 49th to 59th streets and J Street to Folsom Boulevard of East Sacramento was designated as "Little Italy." The neighborhood historically had many Italian immigrants in the early 1900s, with businesses about, with lesser in number today.
 San Jose – San Jose's old Italian neighborhoods are Goose Town, North San Jose and the River Street/San Pedro Neighborhood. Each of these neighborhoods consisted of an Italian Church built by the Italian American community. The River Street Neighborhood is currently being revitalized and is now referred to as Little Italy San Jose.  This neighborhood is located adjacent to the SAP Center and is anchored by a Gateway Arch and Italian Cultural Center & Museum and has several authentic Italian businesses .
 Santa Cruz County – CA coastal county. 
 Sonoma County –the Italian Swiss Colony coop founded in the 1880s by Andrea Sbarbaro from Switzerland.
 Spaghetti Hill, Monterey – birthplace of former Secretary of Defense Leon Panetta. The Salinas Valley also has many Italian descendants.
 South San Francisco – sizable Italian community.
 Stockton – descendants of the 1849 California Gold Rush.
 Temescal, Oakland was thriving with Italian immigrants since the 1960s.

Southern California 

 Altadena/ Pasadena – once had a Little Italy. Nearby Arcadia and Monrovia is where the area's Italian community moved to.
 Beaumont – grape industry.
 Camarillo – wine and grape industry.
 Desert Ridge/Sun City Shadow Hills, Indio.
 Fontana – wine and grape industry.
 Highland.
 Los Angeles
Downtown Los Angeles (Fashion District), Italian community currently located around S Los Angeles Blvd.
Formerly Lincoln Heights, Los Angeles (East Los Angeles (region)) which had a Little Italy, before they relocated to nearby Alhambra and Montebello. Casa Italiana, further n on N Broadway, near Solono Canyon is a historical hall of Italian heritage. 

Italian American Museum of Los Angeles
 Via Italia, San Pedro
 Long Beach has a community, among others in LA metro area.
 Palm Desert in the Coachella Valley – Order of Sons of Italy America has a group there. 15-25% are of Italian descent.
 Palm Springs which has a "Little Tuscany" section, aka Las Palmas and Movie Colony.
 Redondo Beach/ Torrance. 
 San Diego – Little Italy also in Point Loma.
 Ventura/Oxnard.

Colorado 
 Denver – "Little Italy" has its roots in the Highlands neighborhood of North Denver. Italian miners, railroad workers and farmers developed Colorado in the late 19th century, and northern Italians are well represented. Many restaurants and Italian-run businesses remain in the neighborhood. And South Denver along with Cherry Creek has a number of Italian-Americans. 
 Pueblo – Hundreds of Sicilians, particularly, settled in Pueblo at the turn of the 20th century. They have influenced the culture of the city powerfully.
 Trinidad – retirement community in the Sunbelt region of the US typically have many elderly Italian-Americans from the east coast.

Connecticut 
19.3% of Connecticut's population claims Italian ancestry, making it the second most Italian state in the U.S. after Rhode Island.
 Beacon Falls
 Berlin
 Bridgeport
 Little Italy
 Bristol
 Chesire
 Cos Cob
 Danbury
 Derby
 East Haven (43% of residents claim Italian ancestry)
 Fair Haven
 Guilford
 Hamden
 Hartford
 Franklin Avenue, known as Little Italy of Hartford
 Madison
 Meriden
 Middlebury
 Middletown
Large Sicilian population
 Milford
 Naugatuck
 New Haven
 Wooster Square (Little Italy of New Haven) – home of Frank Pepe Pizzeria Napoletana, Sally's Apizza, and a vast number of other purveyors of Apizza
 North Branford
 North Haven
 Norwalk
 Orange
 Oxford
 Prospect
 Seymour
 Southbury
 Southington
 Stamford
 West Side
 Torrington
 Waterbury
 West Haven

Delaware 
 Little Italy, Wilmington
 Shawtown, New Castle

Florida 
 Fort Lauderdale – Little Italy Neighborhood Oakland & A1A near Galt Ocean Mile.
 Miami
Boca Raton
 Naples
 Pompano Beach
 Port St. Lucie
 Tampa / Ybor City

Illinois 
 Chicago:

 Armour Square
 Little Italy
 West Town 
 Addison 
 Berwyn 
 Chicago Heights 
 Cicero 
 East Brooklyn
 Elmwood Park
 Franklin Park
 Herrin 
 Melrose Park
 Norridge
 River Grove
 Rockford
 Rosemont
 Schiller Park
 Skokie 
 South Wilmington

Indiana 
 Indianapolis – The Holy Rosary Neighborhood ("Indy Little Italy")
 Clinton

Louisiana 
 Independence – 30.7% Italian American
 Kenner
 Marrero
 New Orleans French Quarter
 Metairie

Maine 
 India Street, Portland
 Munjoy Hill, Portland (mostly historical)

Maryland 
 Baltimore:
 Highlandtown
 Little Italy
 Locust Point
 Lombard Street
 Bel Air
 Elkridge
 Essex
 Joppatowne
 Laurel
 Middle River
 Parkville
 Perry Hall
 Towson

Massachusetts 
 Boston:
 East Boston (Orient Heights)
 Hyde Park (Readville) 
 North End (Little Italy of Boston)
 Brockton – birthplace of boxing champ Rocky Marciano
 East Cambridge
 Everett
 Framingham
 Gloucester
 Haverhill
 Lawrence
 Leominster
 Lowell
 Lynn
 Medford
 Melrose
 Milford
 Northampton, Massachusetts
 Revere Beach - The Coney Island of New England in Revere 
 Saugus
 South Quincy in Quincy
 Springfield (South-End)
 Taunton
 Waltham
 West Springfield, Massachusetts
 Worcester – Shrewsbury Street

Michigan 
 Caspian, Michigan
 Clinton Township, Macomb County
 Dearborn (West part)
 Deerton, Michigan
 Detroit (Eastern Market is sometimes referred to as Detroit's "Little Italy" and has fewer Italian-Americans and Italian residents than it did in the early 1900s, but some Italian stores and businesses in the area; East Detroit generally had a higher proportion of Italian immigrants and Italian immigrants)
 Gaastra, Michigan
 Loretto, Michigan
 Macomb, Michigan 
 Norway, Michigan
 Saint Clair Shores, Michigan (certain areas)

Minnesota 
 Minneapolis – St. Paul area: West 7th Street and "Nord-east" Minneapolis is an Italian area.
 Northern Minnesota Iron Mines region – 
 Aurora 
 Duluth
 Hibbing

Mississippi 
 Mississippi Delta – 
 Greenville
 Indianola 
 Leland

Missouri 
 The Hill, Saint Louis – Three famous baseball figures—Yogi Berra, Harry Caray and Joe Garagiola—grew up here. 
 Kansas City – The northeast side is a "Little Italy" neighborhood called Columbus Park, known for its Italian culture.

Nebraska 
 Little Italy, Omaha

Nevada 
 Las Vegas

New Hampshire 
 Portsmouth

New Jersey
New Jersey municipalities with over 25% of the population identifying themselves as of Italian ancestry (in those municipalities where at least 1,000 residents identified their ancestry):
 Fairfield – 50.3% (highest percentage for a town in the United States)
 Hammonton – 45.9% (second highest percentage for a town in the United States)
 Dover Beaches South – 42.8%
 East Hanover – 41.3%
 Totowa – 37.7%
 South Hackensack – 36.3%
 Nutley – 36.0%
 Woodland Park (formerly West Paterson) – 34.3%
 Moonachie – 34.1%
 Lyndhurst – 33.8%
 Buena – 33.5%
 Lodi – 33.3%
 Rutherford – 33.2%
 Ocean Gate – 32.5%
 Carlstadt – 31.2%
 Hasbrouck Heights – 30.8%
 West Long Branch – 30.5%
 Netcong – 30.1%
 Gibbstown – 30.1%
 Raritan – 30.1%
 Newfield – 29.8%
 Saddle Brook – 29.8%
 Cedar Grove – 29.7%
 Greenwich Township – 29.3%
 Glendora – 28.7%
 Belleville – 28.7%
 Little Falls – 28.6%
 Wayne – 28.4%
 Kenilworth – 28.0%
 Oceanport – 27.7%
 Lavallette – 27.7%
 North Arlington – 27.4%
 Longport – 27.3%
 Folsom – 27.3%
 Hawthorne – 26.5%
 Bloomfield – 26.4%
 Rochelle Park – 26.1%
 Washington Township – 25.9%
 Mystic Island – 25.9%
 Seaside Heights – 25.7%
 Blackwood – 25.5%
 Belford – 25.3%
 Riverdale – 25.1%
 East Rutherford – 25.1%

Other places in New Jersey
 Asbury Park
 Atlantic City
 Ducktown
 Bayonne (20.1% Italian American)
 Camden
 Clifton
 Elizabeth
 Peterstown neighborhood was densely populated with about 90% Italian-Americans. It became less populated with Italians towards the late 1970s.
 Freehold Township (22.0% Italian-American)
 Garfield
 Hackensack
 Hoboken – Four popular Italian-American celebrities—Frank Sinatra, Buddy Valastro, Jimmy Roselli and Joe Pantoliano—grew up here.
 Howell Township (23.8% Italian-American)
 Jersey City, particularly The Village
 Kearny
 Manalapan
 Margate
 Neptune City
 Newark
 Ironbound, in the Italian Down Neck section. However, it has become less populated by Italian Americans since the 1970s.
 Seventh Avenue
 Orange
 Long Hill
 Paramus
 Paterson
 Little Italy
Paterson used to have the largest Italian percentage of any NJ city.
 Rockaway
 Rutherford
 Sea Isle City
 Fish Alley
 Secaucus
 Toms River (22.6% Italian American)
 Trenton
 South Trenton
Chambersburg
 Ventnor City (22.8% Italian American)
 Verona
 Vineland (22.8% Italian American)
 West New York
 Wildwood and The Wildwoods

New York 
The state of New York has the largest population of Italian Americans, at 3.1 million people. The majority of Italian Americans in New York City originated from southern parts of Italy.

New York City

See Also Italians in New York City for more info.

 The Bronx
 Arthur Avenue (Little Italy of the Bronx)
 Belmont
 East Bronx
 Morris Park
 Pelham Bay
 Throggs Neck
 Country Club
 Brooklyn
 Bath Beach
 Bay Ridge
 Bensonhurst (Little Italy of Brooklyn)
 Carroll Gardens
 Cobble Hill
 Dyker Heights
 Sections of Williamsburg
 Sections of Canarsie
 Sections of Gravesend
 Sections of Marine Park
 Sections of Sheepshead Bay
 Sections of Red Hook and Gowanus
 Sections of Coney Island
 Historical South Brooklyn, especially in the parts of Cobble Hill, South Slope,and  Boeurm Hill.
 Historically and still currently to a lesser extent, significant populations in parts of Greenpoint, East New York, Ocean Hill, Brownsville, Bushwick, Flatbush, and East Flatbush
 Manhattan
Italian Harlem
 Pleasant Avenue
 Little Italy – now engulfed by expanded Chinatown.
Mulberry Street
 Historically, there have been significant populations in much of the Lower East Side, sections of Greenwich Village (especially south of Washington Square Park), and sections of Hell's Kitchen.
 Queens
 Astoria
 Corona Heights
 Forest Hills
 Howard Beach
 Ozone Park
 Middle Village
 Whitestone
 Ridgewood
 Sections of Rockaway Beach
 Staten Island – The borough has the highest proportion of Italian Americans of any county in the United States. About 200,000 residents claim Italian heritage (55%).
 Annadale
 Bulls Head
 Concord
 Eltingville
 Grasmere
 Great Kills
 Huguenot
 Midland Beach
 New Dorp
 New Springville
 Old Town
 Pleasant Plains
 Prince's Bay
 Richmond Valley
 Richmondtown
 Rosebank
 St. George
 South Beach
 Todt Hill
 Tottenville
 Westerleigh

Long Island
Large Italian-American population.
Nassau County
 Bellerose
 Bellmore
 Bethpage
 Carle Place
 East Rockaway
 Farmingdale
 Floral Park
 Franklin Square
 Glen Cove
 Hempstead
 Levittown
 Long Beach
 Lynbrook
 Massapequa
 Massapequa Park (45% Italian-American)
 Mineola
 New Hyde Park
 North Massapequa (47% Italian-American)
 Oceanside
 Valley Stream
 Westbury
 Suffolk County
 Bridgehampton
 Deer Park
 Greenport
 Huntington
 Lindenhurst
 Mastic Beach
 North Babylon
 Selden
 Smithtown
 West Babylon
 West Islip
 Western Fire Island.

Westchester
 Eastchester
 Tuckahoe
 Harrison
 Downtown Harrison
 West Harrison (also known as East White Plains)
 Mount Pleasant
 Hawthorne 
 Thornwood
 Valhalla
 Mamaroneck
 Harbor Heights
 Mount Vernon
 North Side
 New Rochelle
 Downtown New Rochelle
 White Plains
 Yonkers
 Nepperhan
 Bryn Mawr
 Dunwoodie
 Port Chester
 Southwest near I-287 
 Northeast near Rye Brook
 Yorktown
 Yorktown Heights
Yorktown in Westchester County has the annual feast of San Gennaro.

Rockland
 Congers
 Sections of New City
 Sections of Nyack

Upstate New York
 Albany – the South End neighborhood
 Amsterdam
 Auburn
 Binghamton
 Buffalo – the city's north side; however, they are scattered all across Buffalo, including a once high concentration on the city's West Side
 Canandaigua
 Canastota
 Carmel
 Chili
 Cicero
 Cortland
 Endicott – The north side of the village is Little Italy.
 Frankfort
 Fulton
 Gates – Little Italy of Rochester
 Geneva
 Gloversville
 Greece
 Herkimer
 Jamestown
 Kenmore
 Kingston
 Lockport
 Lyncourt
 Mahopac
 Middletown
 Monroe
 Newburgh
 Niagara Falls
 North Syracuse
 Oswego
 Poughkeepsie – primarily the Mount Carmel District
 Rochester – West Side – Gates (the Little Italy of upstate New York)
 Rome – 30.2% Italian-American
 Rotterdam
 Schenectady
 Solvay
 Syracuse
 Eastwood
 Little Italy – on the city's North Side
 Troy – Hillary Clinton has proposed a "Little Italy" section in the city.
 Utica – 28% Italian-American, concentrated in East Utica
 Watertown

North Carolina 
 Valdese, Burke County
 Charlotte
 Raleigh

Ohio 
 Bellevue
 Chesterland
 Cleveland:
 Collinwood
 Little Italy 
 Highland Heights
 Lowellville
 Mayfield Heights
 Mayfield Village
 Niles
 Sandusky
 Perkins Township
 Poland
 South Euclid
 Steubenville 
 Struthers
 Toledo
 Wickliffe
 Youngstown
 Brier Hill

Oklahoma 
 Krebs, Oklahoma
 McAlester in historic Choctaw Nation.
 Muskogee area, from immigration in the 1889 land boom.

Oregon 
 Portland once had a "Little Italy" neighborhood.

Pennsylvania 
 Sections of Aliquippa
 Sections of Altoona – Little Italy and Gospel Hill
 Sections of Ambler
 Sections of  Ambridge
 Sections of Arnold
 Sections of Bangor
 Sections of Braddock
 Sections of Bridgeville
 Sections of Brockway
 Sections of Canonsburg – birthplace of singer Perry Como.
 Sections of Clairton
 Sections of Clifton Heights
 Sections of Coatesville
 Sections of Collingdale
 Sections of Conshohocken
 Sections of Coraopolis
 Sections of Darby
 Sections of Downingtown
 Sections of Drexel Hill
 Sections of Dunmore
 Sections of Easton
 Ellwood City
 Erie
 Farrell
 Sections of Folcroft
 Sections of Glenolden
 Harmony Township
 Sections of Hazleton 
 Homewood
 Hopewell Township
 Jessup
 Kennedy Township
 Koppel
 Sections of Lansdale/North Wales in the North Penn Valley .
 Midland
 New Castle (Mahoningtown)
 New Galilee
 New Kensington
 Sections of Norristown
 Old Forge – 34% of the population
 Penn Hills Township
 Philadelphia – home to the second-largest Italian-American population in the United States, according to the 2000 census
 Overbrook/West Philadelphia
 South Philadelphia – largely Italian
 Bella Vista
 Central South Philadelphia
 Girard Estate
 Italian Market
 Marconi Plaza
 Packer Park
 Passyunk West
 St. Richard
 Whitman
 Areas of Kensington
 Sections of Northeast Philadelphia
 Mayfair
 Tacony
 Sections of Southwest Philadelphia
 Areas of West Kensington
 Pittsburgh
 Bloomfield
 Larimer
 Sections of Pittston
 Sections of the Poconos region.
 Rankin
 Sections of Ridley Township
 Roseto – 41.8% of the population
 Sections of Scranton
 Sewickley
 Sharpsburg
 Stowe Township
 Sections of Upland
 Sections of Upper Darby Township
 Washington
Sections of Wilkes-Barre

Rhode Island 
19% of Rhode Island residents are Italian American, the greatest percentage of any state. 199,180 of Rhode Island's population of 1,048,319 claim Italian ancestry.
 Barrington
 Bristol (21.2%)
 Cranston (34.5% Italian American)
 Johnston
 North Providence
 Providence:
 Charles
 Federal Hill (Little Italy of Providence)
 Warwick (22.8%)
 West Warwick
 Westerly (34.2% Italian American)

Texas
 Greater Houston
 Galveston
 Dallas-Fort Worth Metroplex 
 Highland Park
 Plano

Utah 
 Utah Italians – an article about Italian Americans in Utah, including converts to Mormonism, Waldenses from Lombardy and Italo-Protestants. The state's largest concentration in Sugarhouse district, Salt Lake City facing nearby South Salt Lake. 19th century Italian immigration in Ogden-Weber County.

Washington 
 Seattle
 Tacoma

West Virginia
Approximately 11% of the combined population of "Mountaineer Country", collectively the north central West Virginia cities of Clarksburg, Fairmont and Morgantown, claim Italian ancestry, mostly from Italian immigrants recruited to work in mining and glass manufacturing.
 Clarksburg
 Fairmont
 Follansbee
 Morgantown
 Weirton

Wisconsin
 Greenbush neighborhood of Madison – historically heavily Italian, but older Italians are dying off and younger ones have moved to the suburbs
 Historic Third Ward, Milwaukee
 Cable and other small towns in northern Wisconsin
 Racine
 Kenosha has the largest Italian community in the state.

References

L